Monhysteridae is a family of nematodes belonging to the order Monhysterida.

Genera

Genera:
 Amphimonhystera Allgén, 1929
 Amphimonhystrella Timm, 1961
 Anguimonhystera Andrássy, 1981
 Eumonhystera Andrássy, 1981

References

Nematodes